Dominique Kouas (born 1952) is a Béninois Vodou artist. His work is strongly influenced by traditional anonymous African artists from previous centuries. He is noted for his large metal-based works, which are on display in the International Festival of Vodun Arts and Cultures in Ouidah, but operates a studio in Porto Novo. Among his notable works is a sculpture of a "three-headed, three-footed, three-armed Mami Wata". Another is one which "depicts several faces bearing Fon (two on each cheek, temples, and forehead) and Yoruba (three on each cheek) scarification marks indicating their ethnic membership". The October Gallery in London is also in possession of his art. The work of the Artist achieved in the 80's and 90's is now considered as one of the most influent Beninoise contemporary visual art. His work takes part of the Jordan National Gallery of Fine Arts collection.

References

Male sculptors
1952 births
Living people
Voodoo artists
Yoruba artists
20th-century Beninese sculptors
20th-century male artists
21st-century sculptors
21st-century male artists